ERT may refer to:

Broadcasting 
 ESPN Regional Television, a college football and basketball syndicator
 Hellenic Broadcasting Corporation (Ellinikí Radiofonía Tileórasi), Greece's public broadcaster
 Ente Radio Trieste, public service radio broadcaster of the Free Territory of Trieste.

Health and medicine 
 ERT (company), an American clinical research company
 Enzyme replacement therapy
 Estrogen receptor test
 Estrogen replacement therapy

Sport 
 European Racquetball Tour
 European Rally Trophy

Technology 
 Earth-received time, used when dealing with interplanetary spacecraft
 Electrical resistivity tomography
 Encoder receiver transmitter, a packet radio protocol

Other uses 
 Elektrooniline Riigi Teataja, the official web publication of laws of the Republic of Estonia
 Elizabeth River Tunnels Project, an infrastructure project in Virginia
 Emergency response team
 Emergency Response Team (RCMP) of the Royal Canadian Mounted Police
 Evidence Response Team of the FBI
 Nuclear power plant emergency response team
 Eritai language
 Eritrean Airlines
 European Round Table of Industrialists, an advocacy group
 Exclusive ride time, in amusement parks